Import Tuner Challenge is the international title for Shutokō Battle X (or Shutokou Battle X) (首都高バトル X), a racing game published by Ubisoft and developed by Genki for the Xbox 360. It is the final main installment in the decade running Shutokō Battle series of games known as Tokyo Xtreme Racer in North America and Tokyo Highway Challenge in Europe, and was the last Genki-developed video game. Despite being the last Shutokou Battle game, this is the only Shutokou Battle game to be on the Microsoft console.

Story
After the 13 Devils have been defeated once more in the Kaido Circuit, Motoya Iwasaki, aka Speed King, disappeared suddenly, leaving without a trace. Since then, many drivers from all across Japan come to Tokyo in order to have his title of "Speed King". The hero here is the best friend of Iwasaki and beats Bloodhound, Midnight Cinderella, Platinium Prince, Skull Bullet's gang & eventually, the Phantom 9. In the meantime, Bloodhound reveals to the racer why Iwasaki has been depressed for a long time : his girlfriend died because she was ill and Iwasaki wasn't there to support her.

Gameplay
The player's objective in the game is to make a name of the player out on the highways of Tokyo. The player begins as an unknown driver and as the player progresses through the game by earning increasingly impressive nicknames or Handles as they're called in the game.

The player begins the game with a small amount of currency before picking out the first car. When the player picks the first car, the player will begin a race against Iwasaki. The game features player versus player and a score meter called a spirit points bar.

Reception

While Famitsu received the Japanese version very well, it did not receive well overseas. GameRankings gave it a score of 52.77%, while Metacritic gave it 54 out of 100.

TeamXbox's Nate Ahearn rated the game 4.9 out of 10, saying, "Tuning the numerous parts of your car provides for some decent variation, but you’ll soon figure out that the actual gameplay just isn't very good." IGN's Erik Brudvig criticized the AI for being too easy, saying, "They can be blown away on every turn with only minimal drifting and turning skills."

References

External links
UbiSoft's Official ITC Website
Japanese version's Official Website

2006 video games
Genki (company) games
Racing video games
Video games developed in Japan
Video games set in Tokyo
Xbox 360-only games
Xbox 360 games
Multiplayer and single-player video games